Films About Ghosts (The Best of...) is a compilation album by American rock band Counting Crows. It was released by Geffen Records on November 2, 2003. The album contains songs from all of their studio albums. The album takes its name from a line in Mrs. Potter's Lullaby: "If dreams are like movies, then memories are films about ghosts."

Track listing
United States version

UK version

Later versions of this disc include "Accidentally in Love", the Crows' hit single from the soundtrack of DreamWorks Animation Studios' Shrek 2 (2004). The Dutch version of this album includes a new version of "Holiday in Spain", recorded as a duet with Dutch band Bløf. The single, in English and Dutch, went number one in the Netherlands, as did the album after the success of the single.

The original British version contained the song "Blues Run the Game", a cover of a Jackson C. Frank song. The South American version contained the song "4 White Stallions" (Live from Amsterdam) and Enhanced CD data.

This album was released twice in Australia, the second release containing a DVD of live performances. A version with a second disc containing the Music-Video-Edited versions of "American Girls", "Mrs. Potter's Lullaby", "Angels of the Silences", "Round Here", "Daylight Fading", "A Long December" and "Mr. Jones" was also released in the United Kingdom.

Release history

Charts

Weekly charts

Year-end charts

Single

Certifications

References

External links 

2003 greatest hits albums
Counting Crows compilation albums
2004 video albums
2004 live albums
Live video albums
Geffen Records compilation albums
Counting Crows live albums
Counting Crows video albums